Nakhchivan City Stadium is a multi-purpose stadium in Nakhchivan City, Azerbaijan. It is currently used mostly for football matches and is the home stadium of Araz PFK. The stadium holds 12,800 people. For the stadium's first game, the announced attendance was 4,000.

See also
 List of football stadiums in Azerbaijan
 Vugar Abbasov

References

Sport in Azerbaijan
Football venues in Azerbaijan
Multi-purpose stadiums in Azerbaijan